Irene Chan (born 陳廷芬 in 1965) is an American visual artist and Associate Professor of Print Media and affiliated faculty in Asian Studies at University of Maryland, Baltimore County in Baltimore, Maryland.

Early life 
Chan was born in Chinatown in San Francisco, California in the United States.

Education 
Chan graduated in 1989 from California Polytechnic State University, San Luis Obispo with a Bachelor of Architecture and a minor in English. She obtained her Master of Fine Arts in 1997 from the San Francisco Art Institute, where she received the Bronze Roller Award in Printmaking for Outstanding Artistic Achievement.

Career 
Inspired by Taoist philosophy, Chan's work explores "the impermanence of nature," "patterns and natural phenomena in the cosmic order, like growth and decay: things that are in the movement of evolving from or devolving toward nothingness." Chan makes books, and since 1995 she has owned the publishing house Ch'An Press. She has served as artist in residence at Women's Studio Workshop (WSW) in Rosendale, New York. During her residence at WSW, she produced Cé (1998), a collection of handmade paper and ink that depicts "nature's form, gestures, and movements as a written language."

Chan has illustrated and designed for the Electric Power Research Institute and the American Society of Heating, Refrigerating and Air-Conditioning Engineers. She serves as associate professor in the fine arts department at the University of Maryland, Baltimore County. She lives in Washington, D.C. She finds inspiration in Chinese philosophy and nature.

Chan has been awarded honors from the Minnesota Center for Book Arts, the National Endowment for the Arts, the Maryland State Arts Council, and others. She has exhibited her work at venues and organizations such as the Islington Arts and Media School, San Francisco Arts Commission, A.I.R. Gallery, the University of Delaware, and the Legion of Honor. Her work is held in the collection of the Archives of American Art, Columbia University, Indiana University, British Library, Tate Modern, Walker Art Center, and more.

Chan has been included in the Asian American Arts Centre's artasiamerica digital archive.

Chan is an Associate Professor of Print Media and affiliate faculty in Asian Studies at University of Maryland, Baltimore County in Baltimore, Maryland.

References

External links
Official website
Railroad Track of Violence (project)
Cè (artist book) at the Women's Studio Workshop (PDF)

1965 births
Artists from Washington, D.C.
California Polytechnic State University alumni
Artists from San Francisco
American printmakers
Book artists
San Francisco Art Institute alumni
Living people
Women book artists
American women printmakers
21st-century American women artists